The following is a list of Vancouver International Film Festival award winners.

Award winners by year

2002

Most Popular International Film: Bowling for Columbine by Michael Moore
Most Popular Canadian Film: Expecting by Deborah Day and FIX: The Story of an Addicted City by Nettie Wild
National Film Board Award for Best Documentary: Gambling, Gods and LSD by Peter Mettler

2003

Most Popular International Film: Kamchatka by Marcelo Piñeyro
Most Popular Canadian Film: The Corporation by Mark Achbar and Jennifer Abbott
National Film Board Award for Best Documentary: Los Angeles Plays Itself by Thom Andersen

2004

 Most Popular International Film: Machuca by Andrés Wood
Most Popular Canadian Film: What Remains of Us by François Prévost and Hugo Latulippe and Being Caribou by Leanne Allison and Diana Wilson
 National Film Board Award for Best Documentary: In the Realms of the Unreal by Jessica Yu
 Best Young Canadian Director of a Short Film: Jennifer Calvert for Riverburn

2005

Most Popular International Film: Go, See, and Become by Radu Mihăileanu
Most Popular Canadian Film: Eve and the Fire Horse by Julia Kwan
National Film Board Award for Best Documentary: A Particular Silence by Stefano Rulli

2006

Most Popular International Film: The Lives of Others by Florian Henckel von Donnersmarck
Most Popular Canadian Film: Mystic Ball by Greg Hamilton
National Film Board Award for Best Documentary: Have You Heard From Johannesburg? by Connie Field
Special Jury Prize: Radiant City by Gary Burns and Jim Brown

2007

Vancity People's Choice Award for Most Popular Canadian Film: She's a Boy I Knew directed by Gwen Haworth
Rogers People's Choice Award for Most Popular International Film: Persepolis directed by Marjane Satrapi and Vincent Paronnaud
People's Choice Award for Most Popular International Nonfiction Film: Garbage Warrior directed by Oliver Hodge
Kyoto Planet "Climate for Change" Award: The Planet directed by Johan Söderberg, Michael Stenberg, and Linus Torell
Dragons & Tigers Award for Young Cinema: shared by Fujian Blue directed by Weng Shouming (Robin Weng) and Mid-Afternoon Barks directed by Zhang Yuedong
Citytv Western Canadian Feature Film Award: Normal directed by Carl Bessai
National Film Board of Canada Best Canadian Documentary Feature Award: Up the Yangtze directed by Yung Chang
Women In Film and Television Vancouver Artistic Merit Award: She's a Boy I Knew directed by Gwen Haworth
Most Promising Director of a Canadian Short Film: The Windfisherman directed by Anna McRoberts

2008

Citytv Western Canada Feature Film Award: Fifty Dead Men Walking directed by Kari Skogland
VIFF Nonfiction Feature Award: Born Without directed by Eva Norvind
Most Promising Director of a Canadian Short Film: The Valet directed by Drew McCreadie
Women in Film & Television Vancouver Artistic Merit Award: Mothers & Daughters awarded to Tantoo Cardinal
International Film Guide Inspiration Award: Control Alt Delete directed by Cameron Labine
Rogers People's Choice Award: I've Loved You So Long (Il y a longtemps que je t'aime) directed by Philippe Claudel
documentary Audience Award: Throw Down Your Heart directed by Sascha Paladino
VIFF Most Popular Canadian Film Award: Mothers & Daughters directed by Carl Bessai
National Film Board's Most Popular Canadian Documentary Award: Fierce Light: When Spirit Meets Action directed by Velcrow Ripper
VIFF Environmental Film Audience Award: Blue Gold: World Water Wars directed by Sam Bozzo
Dragons & Tigers Award for Young Cinema: Perfect Life directed by Emily Tang

2009

Canwest Award for Best Canadian Feature Film I Killed My Mother (J'ai tué ma mère) directed by Xavier Dolan
Most Promising Director of a Canadian Short Film: The Last Act directed by Jan Binsse and David Tougas
Women in Film & Television Vancouver Artistic Merit Award: 65 Redroses directed and produced by Nimisha Mukerji and Gillian Lowry
Rogers People's Choice Award: Soundtrack for a Revolution directed by Bill Guttentag and Dan Sturman
documentary Audience Award for Most Popular Nonfiction Film: Facing Ali directed by Pete McCormack
VIFF Most Popular Canadian Film Award: 65 Redroses by Nimisha Mukerji & Philip Lyall
National Film Board's Most Popular Canadian Documentary Award: 65 Redroses by Nimisha Mukerji & Philip Lyall
VIFF Environmental Film Audience Award: At the Edge of the World directed by Dan Stone
Dragons & Tigers Award for Young Cinema: Eighteen directed by Jang Kun-jae

2010

ET Canada Award for Best Canadian Feature Film Incendies directed by Denis Villeneuve
Most Promising Director of a Canadian Short Film Mokhtar, directed by Halima Ouardiri
Rogers People's Choice Award Waste Land (UK, Brazil), directed by Lucy Walker
VIFF Most Popular Nonfiction Film Award, Kinshasa Symphony (Germany), directed by Claus Wischmann and Martin Baer
VIFF Most Popular Canadian Film Award, Two Indians Talking, directed by Sara McIntyre
NFB Most Popular Canadian Documentary Award, Leave Them Laughing, directed by John Zaritsky
VIFF Environmental Film Audience Award, Force of Nature: The David Suzuki Movie (Canada), directed by Sturla Gunnarsson
Dragons & Tigers Award for Young Cinema, Good Morning To The World (Japan), directed by Hirohara Satoru

2011

Shaw Media Award for Best Canadian Feature Film ($20,000 prize) – Nuit #1, Anne Émond (Canada)
Dragons & Tigers Award for Young Cinema, presented by Brad Birarda & Robert Sali ($10,000 prize) – The Sun Beaten Path, Sonthar Gyal (China)
Most Promising Director of a Canadian Short Film Award ($2,000 prize) – We Ate the Children Last, Andrew Cividino (Canada)
Rogers People's Choice Award – A Separation, Asghar Farhadi (Iran)
VIFF Most Popular Nonfiction Film Award – Sing Your Song, Susanne Rostock (USA)
VIFF Most Popular Canadian Film Award – Starbuck, Ken Scott (Canada)
NFB Most Popular Canadian Documentary Award – Peace Out, Charles Wilkinson (Canada)
VIFF Environmental Film Audience Award – People of a Feather, Joel Heath (Canada)

2012

Award for Best Canadian Feature Film ($10,000 prize) –  Blackbird, Jason Buxton (Canada)
Dragons & Tigers Award for Young Cinema, presented by Brad Birarda ($5,000 prize) – Emperor Visits The Hell (Tang Huang You Difu), Li Luo (China)
Most Promising Director of a Canadian Short Film Award ($2,000 prize) – Float, Juan Riedinger (Canada)
Rogers People's Choice Award – The Hunt, Thomas Vinterberg (Denmark)
VIFF Most Popular Canadian Film Award – Becoming Redwood, Jesse James Miller (Canada)
NFB Most Popular Canadian Documentary Award – Blood Relative, Nimisha Mukerji (Canada)
VIFF Most Popular International Documentary Film Award – Nuala, Patrick Farrelly and Kate O'Callaghan (Ireland)
VIFF Environmental Film Audience Award – Revolution, Rob Stewart (Canada)
VIFF Most Popular International First Feature Award – I, Anna, Barnaby Southcombe (UK)
Women in Film & Television Vancouver Artistic Merit Award: Liverpool directed and written by Manon Briand

2013

Award for Best Canadian Feature Film ($5,000 prize each) – Rhymes for Young Ghouls, Jeff Barnaby (Canada) and That Burning Feeling, Jason James (Canada)
Dragons & Tigers Award for Young Cinema, presented by Brad Birarda ($5,000 prize) – Anatomy of a Paperclip, Ikeda Akira (Japan)
Most Promising Director of a Canadian Short Film Award ($2,000 prize) – Nathan, Mathieu Arsenault (Canada)
Rogers People's Choice Award – Like Father, Like Son, Koreeda Hirokazu (Japan)
VIFF Most Popular Canadian Film Award – Down River, Benjamin Ratner (Canada)
VIFF Most Popular Canadian Documentary Award – When I Walk, Jason DaSilva (Canada)
VIFF Most Popular International Documentary Film Award – Desert Runners, Jennifer Steinman (USA)
VIFF Most Popular Canadian Environmental Documentary Award – Salmon Confidential, Twyla Roscovich (Canada)
VIFF Most Popular International First Feature Award – Wadjda, Haifaa al-Mansour (Germany, Saudi Arabia)
Women in Film & Television Vancouver Artistic Merit Award: Sarah Prefers to Run directed and written by Chloé Robichaud

2014

Award for Best Canadian Film ($8,000 prize) – Violent, Andrew Huculiak (Canada)
Most Promising Director of a Canadian Short Film Award – The Cut, Geneviève Dulude-De Celles (Canada)
Rogers People's Choice Award – The Vancouver Asahi, Ishii Yuya (Japan)
VIFF Most Popular Canadian Film Award – Preggoland, Jacob Tierney (Canada)
VIFF Most Popular Canadian Documentary Award – All the Time in the World, Suzanne Crocker (Canada)
VIFF Most Popular International Documentary Film Award – Glen Campbell: I'll Be Me, James Keach (USA)
VIFF BC Emerging Filmmaker Award – Sitting on the Edge of Marlene, Ana Valine (Canada)
VIFF Best BC Film Award – Violent, Andrew Huculiak (Canada)
VIFF Impact Award – Just Eat It: A Food Waste Story, Grant Baldwin (Canada)
VIFF Best New Director (international) – Miss and the Doctors, Axelle Ropert (France) and Rekorder, Mikhail Red (Philippines)
Women in Film & Television Vancouver Artistic Merit Award – Sitting on the Edge of Marlene, Ana Valine

2015

The 34th annual Vancouver International Film Festival was held from September 24 to October 9, 2015. The VIFF Industry Conference – the premier media conference in Western Canada – runs from September 30 to October 3, 2015.

Audience Awards
Rogers People's Choice Award – Brooklyn, John Crowley (UK, Ireland, Canada)
VIFF Most Popular International Documentary – Ingrid Bergman: In Her Own Words (Jag är Ingrid), Stig Björkman (Sweden)
VIFF Most Popular Canadian Feature – Room, Lenny Abrahamson (Ireland, Canada)
VIFF Most Popular Canadian Documentary – Haida Gwaii: On the Edge of the World, Charles Wilkinson (Canada)
VIFF Impact: International Audience Award – Landfill Harmonic, Brad Allgood and Graham Townsley (USA, Paraguay)
VIFF Impact: Canadian Audience Award – Fractured Land, Damien Gillis and Fiona Rayher (Canada)
Women in Film+Television Artistic Merit Award – Ninth Floor, Mina Shum (Canada)

Juried Awards
Best Canadian Film: Sleeping Giant, Andrew Cividino
Best British Columbia Film: Fractured Land, Damien Gillis and Fiona Rayher
British Columbia Emerging Filmmaker: The Devout, Connor Gaston
Emerging Canadian Director: The Sound of Trees (Le Bruit des arbres), François Péloquin
Best Canadian Short Film: Blue-Eyed Blonde, Pascal Plante
Most Promising Director of a Canadian Short Film: Never Steady, Never Still, Kathleen Hepburn

2016
The 35th annual Vancouver International Film Festival was held from September 29 to October 14, 2016.

 Ignite Award – Cabbie, Jessica Parsons and Jennifer Chiu (Canada)
 Best BC Short Film Award – Here Nor There, Julia Hutchings (Canada)
 Best BC Film Award – Window Horses (The Poetic Persian Epiphany of Rosie Ming), Ann Marie Fleming (Canada)
 BC Emerging Filmmaker Award – Hello Destroyer, Kevan Funk (Canada)
 Best Canadian Film – Window Horses (The Poetic Persian Epiphany of Rosie Ming), Ann Marie Fleming (Canada)
 Best Canadian Short Film – Those Who Remain (Ceux qui restent), Mathieu Vachon (Canada)
 Most Promising Director of a Canadian Short Film – Parent, Teacher, Roman Tchjen (Canada)
 Emerging Canadian Director – Never Eat Alone, Sofia Bohdanowicz (Canada)
 Best Canadian Documentary – Living With Giants (Chez les géants), Sebastien Rist and Aude Leroux-Lévesque (Canada)
 VIFF IMPACT Award – Power to Change: The Energy Rebellion (Power to Change – Die Energie Rebellion), Carl-A. Fechner (Germany)
 VIFF Super Channel People's Choice Award – Maudie, Aisling Walsh (Canada, Ireland)
 Most Popular International Feature – I, Daniel Blake, Ken Loach (United Kingdom, France, Belgium)
 Most Popular International Documentary – Human, Yann Arthus-Bertrand (France)
 Most Popular Canadian Documentary – Spirit Unforgettable, Pete McCormack (Canada)

2017
The 36th annual Vancouver International Film Festival was held from September 28 to October 13, 2017

BC Spotlight Awards
 Sea to Sky Award – Never Steady, Never Still, Kathleen Hepburn
 Best BC Film Award – Luk'Luk'I, Wayne Wapeemukwa
 BC Emerging Filmmaker Award – Kathleen Hepburn (Never Steady, Never Still)

Canadian Awards
 Best Canadian Film – Black Cop, Cory Bowles
Emerging Canadian Director – Kathleen Hepburn (Never Steady, Never Still)
 Best Canadian Documentary – Unarmed Verses, Charles Officer
 Best BC Short Film – Rupture, Yassmina Karajah
 Best Canadian Short Film – Shadow Nettes, Phillip Barker
 Most Promising Director of a Canadian Short Film – Vincent Toi (The Crying Conch)

Impact Awards
 VIFF Impact Award – BLUE, Karina Holden

Audience Awards
 Super Channel People's Choice Award – Indian Horse, Stephen Campanelli
 VIFF Most Popular International Feature – Loving Vincent, Dorota Kobiela and Hugh Welchman (Poland, UK)
 VIFF Most Popular International Documentary – Faces Places, Agnès Varda, JR (France)
 VIFF Most Popular Canadian Documentary – Shut Up and Say Something, Melanie Wood
 #mustseebc – Shut Up and Say Something, Melanie Wood

2018
The 37th annual Vancouver International Film Festival was held from September 27 to October 12, 2018.

BC Spotlight Awards
 Sea to Sky Award – Broken Bunny by Meredith Hama-Brown
 Best BC Film Award – Edge of the Knife, Gwaai Edenshaw and Helen Haig-Brown
 BC Emerging Filmmaker Award – Zach Lipovsky and Adam Stein, Freaks
 Best BC Short Film – Biidaaban (The Dawn Comes), Amanda Strong

Canadian Awards
 Best Canadian Film – Edge of the Knife by Gwaai Edenshaw and Helen Haig-Brown
 Emerging Canadian Director – Sean Devlin for When the Storm Fades
 Best Canadian Documentary – The Museum of Forgotten Triumphs by Bojan Bodružić
 Best Canadian Short Film – Fauve by Jérémy Comte
 Most Promising Director of a Canadian Short Film – Claire Edmondson for EXIT

Impact Awards
 VIFF Impact Award – The Devil We Know by Stephanie Soechtig

Audience Awards
 Super Channel People's Choice Award – Finding Big Country by Kathleen Jayme
 VIFF Most Popular International Feature – Shoplifters by Kore-eda Hirokazu
 VIFF Most Popular International Documentary – Bathtubs Over Broadway by Dava Whisenant
 VIFF Most Popular Canadian Feature – Edge of the Knife by Gwaai Edenshaw and Helen Haig-Brown
 #mustseebc – Finding Big Country, Kathleen Jayme

Sustainable Production Excellence Awards
 Sustainable Production Impact - X-Files, season 11
 Sustainable Production Champion - Keep it Green Recycling (Kelsey Evans); Portable Electric (Mark Rabin); Clara George; Ronny Fritsch

2019 
The 38th annual Vancouver International Film Festival was held from September 26 to October 11, 2019.

BC Spotlight Awards

 Sea to Sky Award – Ying Wang for The World Is Bright
 Best BC Film Award – The Body Remembers When the World Broke Open by Elle-Máijá Tailfeathers and Kathleen Hepburn
 BC Emerging Filmmaker Award – Elle-Máijá Tailfeathers for The Body Remembers When the World Broke Open

Canadian Awards

Best Canadian Film – One Day in the Life of Noah Piugattuk by Zacharias Kunuk
Special Mention: Blood Quantum by Jeff Barnaby
 Emerging Canadian Director – Heather Young for Murmur
Special Mention: Myriam Verreault for Kuessipan
 Best Canadian Documentary – Jordan River Anderson, the Messenger by Alanis Obomsawin
Special Mention: My Dads, My Moms and Me by Julia Ivanova
 Best Canadian Short Film – At the Bottom of the Sea by Caroline So Jung Lee
Special Mention: The Physics of Sorrow by Theodore Ushev
 Most Promising Director of a Canadian Short Film: Guillaume Fournier, Samuel Matteau and Yannick Nolin for Acadiana
Special Mention: Jessica Johnson, Ryan Ermacora for Labour/Leisure

Impact Awards
 VIFF Impact Award: Resistance Fighters by Michael Wech
 Rob Stewart Eco Warrior Award: The Pollinators by Peter Nelson

Audience Awards
People's Choice — Parasite by Bong Joon-ho
Most Popular Canadian Film — Red Snow by Marie Clements
Most Popular Canadian Documentary — Haida Modern by Charles Wilkinson
Most Popular International Documentary — Coup 53 by Taghi Amirani

2020 
The 39th annual Vancouver International Film Festival was held from September 24 to October 7, 2020.

BC Spotlight Awards

 Sea to Sky Award — Banchi Hanuse for Nuxalk Radio
 Best BC Film Award — The Curse of Willow Song by Karen Lam
 BC Emerging Filmmaker Award — Jessie Anthony for Brother, I Cry
 Best BC Short Film — Cake Day by Phillip Thomas 

Canadian Awards

 Best Canadian Film — Beans by Tracey Deer
 Special Mention — Nadia, Butterfly by Pascal Plante

 Emerging Canadian Director — Madeleine Sims-Fewer and Dusty Mancinelli for Violation
 Best Canadian Documentary — Call Me Human by Kim O'Bomsawin
 Special Mention — Prayer for a Lost Mitten by Jean-François Lesage

 Best Canadian Short Film — Bad Omen by Salar Pashtoonyar
 Special Mention — Moon by Zoé Pelchat

International Awards

 VIFF Impact Award — The Reason I Jump by Jerry Rothwell

 Rob Stewart Eco Warrior Award — Peter Wohlleben, subject of The Hidden Life of Trees

VIFF Immersed Awards

 Best in Cinematic Live-Action — Kowloon Forest by Alexey Marfin
 Best in Documentary — By the Waters of Babylon by Kristen Lauth Shaeffer and Andrew Halasz
 Best in Animation — The Book of Distance by Randall Okita
 Honorable Mention in Animation — In the Land of Flabby Schnook by Francis Gélinas
 Audience Award — Ecosphere: Raja Ampat by Joseph Purdam

VIFF Immersed Volumetric Market (Microsoft Mixed Reality Capture Studios Special Prize)

 A Vocal Landscape by Omid Zarei and Anne Jeppesen
 Uninterrupted by Nettie Wild and Rae Hull

2021 
The 40th annual Vancouver International Film Festival was held from October 1 to October 11, 2021.

BC Spotlight Awards

 Best BC Film —  Handle With Care: The Legend of the Notic Streetball Crew  by Jeremy Schaulin-Rioux, Kirk Thomas
 BC Emerging Filmmaker Award —   Portraits From a Fire by Trevor Mack
 Best BC Short Film — The Horses (Liz Cairns)

Canadian Awards

 Best Canadian Film — Without Havana (Sin la Habana) by Kaveh Nabatian
 Emerging Canadian Director — Caroline Monnet  for Bootlegger
 Best Canadian Documentary — Returning Home by Sean Stiller
 Best Canadian Short Film — Together by Albert Shin

International Awards

 Impact Award — Blue Box (Michal Weits)
 Rob Steward Eco Warrior Award —  Coextinction (Gloria Pancrazi, Elena Jean)

VIFF Immersed Awards

 Cinematic Live Action — Symphony (Igor Cortadellas)
 Documentary —  Inside COVID19 (Gary Yost, Adam Loften)
 Augmented Reality —  Mission to Mars AR (Piotr Baczyński, Bartosz Rosłoński)
 Animation — Beat (Keisuke Itoh)
 VeeR Audience Award — Red Eyes (Sngmoo Lee)
 XR Market Grant — Memory Place (Zeynep Abes)

Award winners by award

Best Canadian Film

Most Popular Canadian Film 
Most Popular Canadian Film

2002 — Expecting directed by Deborah Day and FIX: The Story of an Addicted City by Nettie Wild
2003 — The Corporation by Mark Achbar and Jennifer Abbott
2004 — What Remains of Us by François Prévost and Hugo Latulippe and Being Caribou by Leanne Allison and Diana Wilson
2005 — Eve and the Fire Horse by Julia Kwan
2006 — Mystic Ball by Greg Hamilton

Vancity People's Choice Award for Most Popular Canadian Film

 2007 — She's a Boy I Knew by Gwen Haworth

VIFF Most Popular Canadian Film Award

2008 — Mothers & Daughters by Carl Bessai
2009 — 65 Redroses by Nimisha Mukerji and Philip Lyall
2010 — Two Indians Talking by Sara McIntyre
2011 — Starbuck by Ken Scott
2012 — Becoming Redwood by Jesse James Miller
2013 — Down River by Benjamin Ratner
2014 — Preggoland by Jacob Tierney
2015 — Room by Lenny Abrahamson (Ireland, Canada)
2016 — Maudie by Aisling Walsh
2017 — Indian Horse by Stephen Campanelli
2018 (VIFF Most Popular Canadian Feature) — Edge of the Knife by Gwaai Edenshaw and Helen Haig-Brown
2019 (Most Popular Canadian Film) — Red Snow by Marie Clements
2020 — Beans by Tracey Deer
2021 — Handle With Care: The Legend of the Notic Streetball Crew by Jeremy Schaulin-Rioux and Kirk Thomas
2022 — TBA

Most Popular International Film 
Most Popular International Film

2002 — Bowling for Columbine by Michael Moore
2003 — Kamchatka by Marcelo Piñeyro
2004 — Machuca by Andrés Wood
2005 — Go, See, and Become by Radu Mihăileanu
2006 — The Lives of Others by Florian Henckel von Donnersmarck

Rogers People's Choice Award for Most Popular International Film

2007 — Persepolis directed by Marjane Satrapi and Vincent Paronnaud

VIFF Most Popular International First Feature Award

2012 — I, Anna by Barnaby Southcombe (UK)
2013 — Wadjda by Haifaa al-Mansour (Germany, Saudi Arabia)
2016 (Most Popular International Feature) — I, Daniel Blake by Ken Loach (United Kingdom, France, Belgium)
2017 — Loving Vincent by Dorota Kobiela and Hugh Welchman (Poland, UK)
2018 — Shoplifters by Kore-eda Hirokazu

References